The Volga-Tatar Legion or Idel-Ural Legion denoted a series of units within the Wehrmacht in World War II. It was recruited among Muslim Volga Tatar in the Soviet Union, but also included other Idel-Ural peoples, including Bashkirs, Chuvashes, Maris, Tatars, Udmurts, and Mordvins. Germany promoted the Idel-Ural Legion as evidence that Muslim Turkic peoples were opposed to Russia and Bolshevism, but they also wanted to spare German blood.

The legion was established in 1942 and comprised around 12,500 men, spread over seven battalions numbered 825 to 831. On February 23, 1943, near Vitebsk, Belarus, the entire  (about 900 soldiers) went over to the partisans.

One of the most notable members of the legion was Soviet–Tatar poet Musa Cälil, who was later executed by the Gestapo for sabotage.

See also 
Ostlegionen

References

Foreign volunteer units of the Wehrmacht
Russian collaborators with Nazi Germany
Waffen-SS brigades
Collaborators with Nazi Germany
Volga Tatars

bg:Идел-Урал